Hieracium crispulum is a species of flowering plant belonging to the family Asteraceae. It is native to Finland and northwestern and northern Russia.

References

crispulum